Social psychiatry is a branch of psychiatry that focuses on the interpersonal and cultural context of mental disorder and mental wellbeing. It involves a sometimes disparate set of theories and approaches, with work stretching from epidemiological survey research on the one hand, to an indistinct boundary with individual or group psychotherapy on the other. Social psychiatry combines a medical training and perspective with fields such as social anthropology, social psychology, cultural psychiatry, sociology and other disciplines relating to mental distress and disorder. Social psychiatry has been particularly associated with the development of therapeutic communities, and to highlighting the effect of socioeconomic factors on mental illness. Social psychiatry can be contrasted with biopsychiatry, with the latter focused on genetics, brain neurochemistry and medication. Social psychiatry was the dominant form of psychiatry for periods of the 20th century but is currently less visible than biopsychiatry.

After reviewing the history and activities of social psychiatry, Vincenzo Di Nicola reviews three major questions for social psychiatry and concludes with a manifesto for a 21st-century social psychiatry:

 What is social about psychiatry? This addresses definitional problems that arise, such as binary thinking, and the need for a common language.
 What are the theory and practice of social psychiatry? Issues include social psychiatry's core principles, values, and operational criteria; the social determinants of health and the Global Mental Health (GMH) Movement; and the need for translational research. This part of the review establishes the minimal criteria for a coherent theory of social psychiatry and the view of persons that emerges from such a theory, the social self.  
 Why the time has come for a manifesto for social psychiatry. This manifesto outlines the parameters for a theory of social psychiatry, based on both the social self and the social determinants of health, to offer an inclusive social definition of health, concluding with a call for action.

History
The events of the first half of the 20th century brought the issue of the relationship between the individual and the community to the fore. Psychiatrists who showed a willingness to confront these issues at home, after the war, called themselves social psychiatrists. Psychoanalytic psychotherapy and all its offshoots were grounded in an approach to the patient that focused almost exclusively on the individual—the relational aspects of therapy were implicit in the relationship between therapist and patient, but the main source of problem and motivation for change was seen as being intrapsychic (within the individual). The social and political contexts were largely disregarded. Sarason observed in 1981, that "it is as though society does not exist for the psychologist. Society is a vague, amorphous background that can be disregarded in one's efforts to fathom the laws of behavior" (Sarason 1981).

Early landmarks in social psychiatry included: Karen Horney, MD, who wrote about personality as it interacts with other people (1937); Erik Erikson, who discussed the influence of society on development (1950); Harry Stack Sullivan's (1953) integration of sociological and psychodynamic concepts, and his work on the role of early interpersonal interactions in the development of the self; Cornell University's Midtown Manhattan Study, which looked at the prevalence of mental illness in Manhattan; August Hollingshead, PhD, and Frederick Redlich, MD, looked at the influence of social class on psychiatric conditions (1958); Alexander H. Leighton, MD, looked at the relationship between social disintegration and mental illness (1959); Burrow was an early pioneer of the social causes of mental disorder and suggested "Sociatry" as the name for this new discipline.

Over the years many sociologists have contributed theories and research which has enlightened psychiatry in this area (e.g. Avison and Robins); The relationship between social factors and mental illness was demonstrated by the early work of Hollingshead and Readlich in Chicago in the 1930s, who found a high concentration of individuals diagnosed with schizophrenia in deprived areas of the city has been replicated numerous times throughout the world, although controversy still exists as to the extent of drift of vulnerable individuals to these areas or of a higher incidence of the disorder in the socially disadvantaged; the Midtown Manhattan Study conducted in the 1950s by Cornell University hinted at widespread psychopathology among the general population of New York City (Srole, Sanger, Michael, Opler, and Rennie, 1962); the Three Hospitals Study (Wing JK and Brown GW, Social Treatments of Chronic Schizophrenia: a comparative survey of three mental hospitals, 1961, Journal of Mental Science, 107, 847–861) was a very influential work that has been replicated, that demonstrated forcefully that the poverty of the environment in poor mental hospitals lead to greater handicaps in the patients.

Social psychiatry was instrumental in the development of therapeutic communities. Under the influence of Maxwell Jones, Main, Wilmer and others (Caudill 1958; Rapoport 1960), combined with the publications of critiques of the existing mental health system (Greenblatt et al. 1957, Stanton and Schwartz 1954) and the sociopolitical influences that permeated the psychiatric world, the concept of the therapeutic community and its attenuated form—the therapeutic milieu—caught on and dominated the field of inpatient psychiatry throughout the 1960s. The aim of therapeutic communities was a more democratic, user-led form of therapeutic environment, avoiding the authoritarian and demeaning practices of many psychiatric establishments of the time. The central philosophy is that clients are active participants in their own and each other's mental health treatment and that responsibility for the daily running of the community is shared among the clients and the staff. "TCs" have often eschewed or limited medication in favor of psychoanalytically derived group-based insight therapies.

Current work
Social psychiatry can be most effectively applied in helping to develop mental health promotion and prevent certain mental illnesses by educating individuals, families, and societies.

Social psychiatry has been important in developing the concept of major "life events" as precipitants of mental ill health, including, for example, bereavement, promotion, moving house, or having a child.

Originally inpatient centers, many therapeutic communities now operate as day centers, often focused on borderline personality disorder and run by psychotherapists or art therapists rather than psychiatrists.

Social psychiatrists help test the cross-cultural use of psychiatric diagnoses and assessments of need or disadvantage, showing particular links between mental illness and unemployment, overcrowding and single parent families.

Social psychiatrists also work to link concepts such as self-esteem and self-efficacy to mental health, and in turn to socioeconomic factors.

Social psychiatrists work on social firms in regard to people with mental health problems. These are regular businesses in the market that employ a significant number of people with disabilities, who are paid regular wages and work on the basis of regular work contracts. There are approximately 2,000 social firms in Europe and a large percentage of people with disabilities who work in social firms have a psychiatric disability. Some are specifically for people with psychiatric disabilities. (Schwarz, G. & Higgins, G: Marienthal the social firms network Supporting the Development of Social Firms in Europe, UK, 1999)

Social psychiatrists often focus on rehabilitation in a social context, rather than "treatment" per se. A related approach is community psychiatry.

Facilitating the social inclusion of people with mental health problems is a major focus of modern social psychiatry.

See also
 American Association of Community Psychiatrists
 DSM-IV Codes
 Structured Clinical Interview for DSM-IV (SCID)
 Relational disorder (proposed DSM-V new diagnosis)

References

 S Moffic (1998) Social Psychiatry, Managed Care and the New Millennium. Psychiatric Times.  December 1998  Vol. XV  Issue 12
 L. Srole, T. Sanger, S. Michael, M.K. Opler, and T.A.C. Rennie, Mental Health in the Metropolis: The Midtown Manhattan Study, McGraw, 1962
 Mohan, Brij. 1973. Social Psychiatry in India: A Treatise on the Mentally Ill. Calcutta: Minerva.

External links
 https://web.archive.org/web/20050327051651/http://www.sanctuaryweb.com/main/social_psychiatry.htm
 http://library.cpmc.columbia.edu/hsl/archives/findingaids/opler.html
 Faculty of Rehabilitation and Social Psychiatry of the Royal College of Psychiatrists in the UK.
 Social psychiatry and public mental health: present situation and future objectives. Time for rethinking and renaissance?

Psychiatric specialities
Schizophrenia